Herbert Doyan Welch, Jr. (born January 12, 1961) is a former American football safety in the National Football League (NFL) for the New York Giants, Washington Redskins, and the Detroit Lions. He also played in the World League of American Football (WLAF) for the Sacramento Surge.  Welch played college football at the University of California, Los Angeles and was drafted in the twelfth round of the 1985 NFL Draft.

External links
 

1961 births
Living people
American football defensive backs
Cerritos Falcons football players
UCLA Bruins football players
New York Giants players
Washington Redskins players
Detroit Lions players
Sacramento Surge players